Prolabeops melanhypopterus is a species of cyprinid in the genus Procypris. It has been assessed as "least concern" on the IUCN Red List and is considered harmless to humans.

References

Endemic fauna of Cameroon
Cyprinid fish of Africa
Fish of Cameroon
IUCN Red List least concern species